Dorothea Wierer (born 3 April 1990) is an Italian biathlete competing in the Biathlon World Cup. Together with Karin Oberhofer, Dominik Windisch and Lukas Hofer she won a bronze medal in the Mixed relay at the 2014 Winter Olympics, in Sochi, Russia. At the 2018 Winter Olympics in Pyeongchang, South Korea she won again the bronze medal in the Mixed relay with Lisa Vittozzi, Lukas Hofer and Dominik Windisch. At the 2022 Winter Olympics in Beijing, China, she won her first individual medal in the Sprint.  She is the 2019 Mass Start World Champion and the 2020 Pursuit and Individual World Champion.

Career
Wierer has won her first Biathlon World Championships medal, placing third in the Women's relay together with Nicole Gontier, Michela Ponza and Karin Oberhofer at the Biathlon World Championships 2013 in Nové Město na Moravě, which was the first ever medal for Italian women at the Biathlon World Championships. At the 2019 Championships in Östersund, she won the gold medal in the 12.5 km Mass Start, also a first for Italian women in Biathlon. She has currently won 11 medals in total, including 3 Golds, 5 Silvers and 3 Bronzes.

At the start of the 2015–16 season, Wierer recorded the first win in her career in the Biathlon World Cup in Östersund and as of the end of 2021-22 season, Wierer has finished on the podium 45 times with 13 wins. She has also finished on the podium in 23 relays, including five victories. She has won the 2018–19 Overall World Cup (first Italian to do so, including men). Wierer defended the overall title in the 2019–20 Season (the first woman to do since Magdalena Forsberg in 2001/02) and has also won 4 disciplines cup, the 2015–16 Individual World Cup, the 2018–19 Pursuit World Cup, the 2019–20 Mass Start World Cup and the 2020-21 Individual World Cup.

In February 2019, Wierer became the third biathlete (after French Martin Fourcade and Marie Dorin Habert) to achieve a victory in every biathlon discipline.

Record

Olympic Games
3 medals (3 bronze)

Wierer has won three medals from Olympic Games. In Sochi, she won a bronze medal in the  Mixed relay. In Pyeongchang, she won another bronze medal in the same discipline, mixed relay. In Beijing she won her first individual medal in Sprint.

*The mixed relay was added as an event in 2014.

World Championships
12 medals (4 gold, 5 silver, 3 bronze)

*The single mixed relay was added as an event in 2019.

Junior/Youth World Championships

World Cup

*Updated as of 19 March 2023, all the point totals count the dropped results, if there are any. Italic means the season is still ongoing

Overall record

* Results in IBU World Cup races, Olympics and World Championships.
** Updated as of 9 March 2023

Individual podiums
 16 victories (6 Individuals, 4 Sprints, 2 Pursuits, 4 Mass starts) 
 50 podiums (6 Individuals, 17 Sprints, 19 Pursuits, 8 Mass starts) 

*Results are from IBU races which include the Biathlon World Cup, Biathlon World Championships and the Winter Olympic Games.
*Bolded lines are WCH or WOG races

Relay podiums
 6 victories (3 Women relays, 2 Mixed relays, 1 Single mixed relay) 
 28 podiums (13 Women relays, 13 Mixed relays, 2 Single mixed relays) 

*Results are from IBU races which include the Biathlon World Cup, Biathlon World Championships and the Winter Olympic Games.
*Bolded lines are WCH or OWG races

See also
Italian sportswomen multiple medalists at Olympics and World Championships

Notes

Notes about WC results

During Wierer's career, all World Championships results counted for the World Cup of that season. Olympic Winter Games results did not.

References

External links
 
 
  
 Dorothea Wierer

1990 births
Living people
Italian female biathletes
Olympic biathletes of Italy
Olympic bronze medalists for Italy
Olympic medalists in biathlon
Biathletes at the 2014 Winter Olympics
Biathletes at the 2018 Winter Olympics
Biathletes at the 2022 Winter Olympics
Medalists at the 2014 Winter Olympics
Medalists at the 2018 Winter Olympics
Medalists at the 2022 Winter Olympics
Biathlon World Championships medalists
Sportspeople from Bruneck
Biathletes of Fiamme Gialle
Germanophone Italian people